Sri C. Achutha Menon Government College is situated in Kuttanellur, in Thrissur city of Kerala in India. The college is affiliated to the University of Calicut and has hostel facilities. The college provides bachelor's degree courses in various streams like arts, commerce and science.

History
Thrissur Government College was established in 1972. The college started functioning in the present Government Training College premises on 14 August 1972 with 200 students and 9 teachers. Prof. Subbayyan T R was the first principal. The courses offered were one Pre – Degree batch each for the 3rd and 4th Groups and Degree courses in History and Economics. The college, affiliated to the Calicut University, was formally inaugurated by the then Chief Minister, the Late C. Achutha Menon on 28 October 1972. Two more courses, viz. B.A English and B.Com were started in 1976 and 1978respectively. The introduction of the M.Com course in 1984 elevated the institution to the level of a Post-graduate college.

In recognition of the good performance of the college and its potential for development it was resolved to shift the college to a 25-acre land campus of its own at Kuttanellur. The foundation stone for the new building was laid by Sri. K. Karunakaran, the then Chief Minister, on 20 April 1985. In 1991, the college shifted to the new campus. After the shifting of the college, it started three new Post-Graduate courses of History, Economics and English in 1995, 1996 and 1998 respectively. In the year 1997, which was its Silver Jubilee year, the college was renamed Sri. C Achutha Menon Govt. College, after the late Chief Minister.

Departments
 Commerce and Management Studies
 Economics
 English
 History
 Hindi
 Malayalam
 Sanskrit
 Statistics
 Political Science
 Physical Education
 Computer Science
 Psychology
 Maths

Academic courses
This college offers both under graduate and post graduate courses.

Under-Graduate Courses
 B A Economics
 B A English
 B A History
 B B A
 B.Com
 Bsc Computer Science
 Bsc Psychology
Bsc Statistics

Post-Graduate Courses
 M A Economics
 M A English
 M A History
 M.Com
Msc Psychology

Notable alumni

 K. P. Rajendran, Ex Minister for Revenue and Land Reforms of State of Kerala

References

External links

Colleges affiliated with the University of Calicut
Colleges in Thrissur
1972 establishments in Kerala
Educational institutions established in 1972